Tengku Zubaidah binti Tengku Norudin or Kangsadal Pipitpakdee is a Thai woman of Malay descent and member of Pattani Royal Family. She is the former wife of Sultan Muhammad V, the 29th Sultan of Kelantan.

Early life 
Tengku Zubaidah is the third child of Wairot Phiphitphakdi (Tengku Norudin bin Tengku Muda) and Yaowalak Phiphitphakdi (Cik Jamilah binti Cik Abdullah). Wairot was a former Thai politician from the Thai Rak Thai Party and a member of Parliament for Pattani for five terms. She was born in 1979 at the Jering Royal Palace, Pattani, Thailand.

Tengku Zubaidah's family is a descendant of the royal family of Pattani who once led Pattani before it was conquered by Thailand in 1902. Her father, Wairot was the son of Phra Phiphitphakdi (Tengku Muda Abdul Putra) and his third wife Sawas (formerly Darachat), who was a Thai citizen of Chinese descent from Bangkok.

Tengku Zubaidah is the cousin of Raja Perempuan Tengku Anis, the mother of Sultan Muhammad V.  Her father, Wairot is a half-brother of Raja Perempuan Tengku Anis's father, Tengku Abdul Hamid bin Tengku Muda Abdul Putra.

Education 
Tengku Zubaidah studied at the Demonstration School of Prince of Songkla University, Pattani and obtained a Bachelor’s Degree of Science from Mahidol University, Bangkok in 2003.

Personal life 
On 15 November 2004, Tengku Zubaidah married Tengku Muhammad Faris Petra (now Sultan Muhammad V), the eldest son of Sultan Ismail Petra and Raja Perempuan Tengku Anis. After their marriage, her official title became Yang Teramat Mulia (Her Royal Highness) Tengku Zubaidah binti Tengku Norudin, the Tengku Ampuan Mahkota (Crown Princess) of Kelantan. The marriage ended in divorce in 2008.

References

1979 births
Living people
Thai Muslims
Tengku Zubaidah Tengku Norudin
People from Pattani province